The 11th Gaon Chart Music Awards ceremony was held at Jamsil Arena in Seoul on January 27, 2022, to recognise the best artists and recordings, primarily based on Gaon Music Chart of the year from December 1, 2020, to November 30, 2021. The ceremony was hosted by Doyoung, Sieun, and Jaejae.

Winners and nominees 
 Winners are listed first and emphasized in bold.
 Nominees

Main awards

Other awards

Presenters
The list of presenters was announced on January 19, 2022.

Performers
The lineup was announced on January 11, 2022.

Notes

References 

2022 in South Korean music
Gaon